The Central International League was a four–team minor baseball league that played in 1912. A Class C level league, the Central International League played only the 1912 season, with the Duluth White Sox winning the league championship. In 1913, the league expanded and was renamed to become the Northern League.

History
It featured four teams: the Duluth White Sox, Superior Red Sox, Grand Forks Flickertails and Winnipeg Maroons. Duluth won the league's championship in 1912, with a record of 58–41. Superior (51–54) placed second, ten games behind. Grand Forks (50–55) was third and Winnipeg (50–59) was last. In 1913, the league expanded to include clubs in Minneapolis, St. Paul, Virginia, and Winona, Minnesota, and its name changed to the Northern League.

10–year major league veteran Joe Sommer managed Superior and Otto Krueger, who spent seven years in the majors, managed Winnipeg. Tracy Baker, who played for the Boston Red Sox in 1911, played in the league.

Cities represented 
 Duluth, MN: Duluth White Sox 1912 
 Grand Forks, ND: Grand Forks Flickertails 1912 
 Superior, WI: Superior Red Sox 1912 
 Winnipeg, MB: Winnipeg Maroons 1912

Standings & statistics

1912 Central International League
schedule
No playoffs scheduled. No individual stats available.

References

Defunct minor baseball leagues in the United States
Baseball leagues in Minnesota
Baseball leagues in North Dakota
Baseball leagues in Wisconsin
Defunct baseball leagues in Canada
1912 establishments in the United States
1912 disestablishments in the United States
Sports leagues established in 1912
Sports leagues disestablished in 1912